The 1942 Tour de Hongrie was the 12th edition of the Tour de Hongrie cycle race and was held from 27 to 29 June 1942. The race started in Budapest and finished in Nagyvárad. The race was won by Ferenc Barvik.

Route

General classification

References

1942
Tour de Hongrie
Tour de Hongrie